Fawaz Abdullah Zureikat (also known as Zuraiqat or Zurayqat, born 1955 - died 2010) was a Jordanian businessman. Zureikat was implicated in the United Nations Oil-for-Food scandal relating to corruption surrounding Iraq's oil exports.

Business 
In the 2004 Duelfer Report, Zureikat was identified as receiving oil allocations from Iraq via Middle East Semi Conductors Co. In other documents, another company called Aredio Petroleum was also linked to Zureikat. He had been doing business in Iraq since 1986, and his brother Hatem has been a political prisoner in Syria since 1981. Hatem who once shared a cell with Tariq Aziz.

For a time, he was station manager of Arab Television (ATV), a short-lived English-language satellite channel with offices in London and Baghdad which filmed and distributed the worldwide rights to the pre-Iraq War interview conducted in Baghdad between Tony Benn and Saddam Hussein.

He was also a member of the National Mobilization Committee for the Defense of Iraq (NMCDI), based in Jordan, and a passionate opponent of sanctions on Iraq. He was arrested on March 3, 2003, in Amman by The Jordanian intelligence services, along with other prominent businessmen who had financial links with Saddam Hussein's regime. He was later released.

References

External links 
 "Jordan: Possible prisoner of conscience/Legal concern, Fawaz Zurayqat", Amnesty International, 24 March 2003.

1955 births
Jordanian businesspeople
2010 deaths